Provadiya (Провадия, Провадийска река, Provadiya, Provadiyska reka; "Provadiya river") is a river in northeastern Bulgaria. It takes its name from the town of Provadiya. It is 119 km long and has a drainage basin of 2,132 km2. The river takes its source from close to the village of Dobri Voynikovo in Shumen Province, flowing southeast and then making a sharp turn northeast to empty into Lake Beloslav. It is part of the Black Sea drainage area, as Lake Beloslav is connected to Lake Varna and it to the Black Sea.

References

Rivers of Bulgaria
Landforms of Varna Province
Landforms of Shumen Province
Tributaries of the Black Sea